is a passenger railway station located in the city of Sagamihara, Kanagawa, Japan and operated by the private railway operator Odakyu Electric Railway.

Lines
It lies 33.8 kilometers from Shinjuku.

Station layout
The station consists of two opposed side platforms serving two tracks. The station building is elevated above the platforms and tracks.

Platforms

History
Its name was shortened to Higashi-Rinkan on October 15, 1941.

Passenger statistics
In fiscal 2019, the station was used by an average of 22,006 passengers daily.

The passenger figures for previous years are as shown below.

Surrounding area
Toshiba Rinkan Hospital
Morishita Memorial Hospital

See also
 List of railway stations in Japan

References

External links

  

Railway stations in Japan opened in 1929
Odakyū Enoshima Line
Railway stations in Sagamihara